Chari may refer to:

Places
 Chari River, in Central Africa
 Chari-Baguirmi (disambiguation), in Chad
 Chari Department, in Chad, one of three departments making up the region of Chari-Baguirmi
 Moyen-Chari (disambiguation), in Chad
 Chari, Iran, a village in Kerman Province, Iran
 Chari, North Khorasan, a village in North Khorasan Province, Iran

Other uses
 Chari (surname)
 Chari Jazz, a Chadian band
 Ch'ari, a letter in the Georgian alphabet

See also

 Cheri (disambiguation)
 Cherie (disambiguation)
 Cherri (disambiguation)
 Cherrie, a surname or given name
 Cherry (disambiguation)
 Shari (disambiguation)
 Sheri (disambiguation)
 Sherie, a given name
 Sherri (name)
 Sherrie, a given name
 Sherry (disambiguation)
 Shery (born 1985), Guatemalan Latin pop singer and songwriter